Ōpōtiki District Council or Opotiki District Council is the territorial authority for the Ōpōtiki District of New Zealand.

The council is led by the mayor of Ōpōtiki, who is currently  and the only mayor of Maori descent. There are also six ward councillors.

References

External links

 Official website

Ōpōtiki District
Politics of the Bay of Plenty Region
Territorial authorities of New Zealand